Mount Tamalpais State Park is a California state park, located in Marin County, California. The primary feature of the park is the  Mount Tamalpais. The park contains mostly redwood and oak forests. Muir Woods National Monument is surrounded by the state park.

Cushing Memorial Amphitheatre

The Cushing Memorial Theater, also known as the Mountain Theater, is an open-air theater built in the 1930s. The natural-stone amphitheater seats 3,500 people and features the Mountain Play each spring, produced every year since 1913. In the summer, monthly astronomy programs are held in the theater for free to the public.

Gallery

See also

Mount Tamalpais and Muir Woods Railway
List of beaches in California
List of California state parks

References

External links

 Official California State Parks department site

State parks of California

Parks in Marin County, California
1963 establishments in California
Protected areas established in 1963
Bay Area Ridge Trail